Melghat was among the first nine tiger reserves of India to be notified in 1973 under Project Tiger. Melghat Wildlife Sanctuary was declared as in 1985. The Tapti River flows through the northern part of Melghat Tiger Reserve, and forms the boundary of the reserve together with the Gawilghur ridge of the Satpura Range.

History
There are passes in Melghat that Kings from the north traversed to reach Berar, where the Imad Shahi dynasty had been founded in 1484. The historic forts, Narnala and Gawilgarh, guarded the main east-west ridge. In 1803, in the Second Maratha War, Colonel Arthur Wellesley, who later became the Duke of Wellington, captured the Gawilgarh fort from the Marathas.

Geography
At the northern extreme of the Amravati district of Maharashtra, on the border of Madhya Pradesh, lies the Melghat in the South-western Satpura mountain ranges.  Melghat means 'meeting of the ghats', which describes the area as a large tract of unending hills and ravines scarred by jagged cliffs and steep climbs.

The Melghat area was declared a tiger reserve in 1974. The Meghat Tiger Reserve divided into Sipna, Gugamal and Akot Wildlife Division, administratively. Presently, the total area of the reserve is around 1677 km2. In Sipna and Gugamal Wildlife Division, there are more than 10 villages in the core area. In Akot wildlife Division, there are no villages in core area. All villages are rehabilitated in akot wildlife division.

The forest is tropical dry deciduous in nature, dominated by teak (Tectona grandis). The reserve is a catchment area for five major rivers: the Khandu, Khapra, Sipna, Gadga and Dolar. These all rivers are tributaries of the river Tapti.

Fauna

The main fauna in Melghat are Bengal tiger, Indian leopard, sloth bear, dhole, Indian jackal, sambar, gaur, barking deer, nilgai, chital, chausingha, honey badger, flying squirrel, wild boar, langur, rhesus monkey, indian porcupine, indian pangolin, mouse deer, python, smooth-coated otter and blacknaped hare.

Population
There are 61 villages in the reserve, all outside the core area.  22 are in the buffer zone and 39 in the Multiple Use Area (MUA). Human population in the buffer zone and MUA is 11024 and 15642, respectively, as per 1994 census.

The inhabitants are mainly tribal, largely of the Korku tribe (80 per cent) and others like Gond, Nihal, Balai, Gaolan, Gawali, Halbi, Wanjari, and Maratha. All inhabitants depend on the forest for bona fide domestic needs of firewood, timber, fodder, medicinal plants, and non-timber forest products like fruit, flowers, gum and medicinal plants. Their main source of income is from labor and rainy season agriculture.

Tourism

Melghat, located in the Amaravati district of Maharashtra, is a tiger reserve wildlife sanctuary. Melghat Tiger Reserve is located on the southern offshoot of the Satpura Hill Range in Central India, called Gavilgarh Hill. It is 225 km west of Nagpur. It was established as a wildlife sanctuary in 1967, and was declared a tiger reserve in 1974. It was among the first nine tiger reserves notified in 1973-74 under Project Tiger, a wildlife conservation project initiated in India in 1972 to protect Bengal tigers.

Apart from Tigers the other prominent animals are Sloth Bear, Indian Gaur, Sambar deer, Leopard, Nilgai, etc. The endangered and 'back from extinction' Forest Owlet is also found in various areas of Melghat.

Tourism in Melghat is distributed along 4 centres/villages. Semadoh, Chikhaldara, Harisal & Shahnur. There are some additional stay facilities at Kolkas which is 14 km ahead of Semadoh.

The nearest railway station to reach Chikhaldara, Semadoh, Kolkas, Harisal is Amravati. Shahnur is closest to Akola. The nearest airport is at Nagpur some 250 km away.

Tourists can explore Melghat in all seasons but the monsoons starting mid July till end of September offers the best views. The winters are cold with night temperature dropping below 5 degrees. The summers are good for animal sightings.

Accommodation facilities in Melghat are mostly run by forest department except the hotels and resorts at Chikhaldara which are operated by private. Facilities are comfortable and basic in nature suiting the forest atmosphere where it is located.

References

External links

 
 Detailed map

Tiger reserves of India
Wildlife sanctuaries in Maharashtra
Berar
Amravati district